The chestnut-headed flufftail (Sarothrura lugens) is a species of bird in the family Sarothruridae.
It is found in Angola, Cameroon, Democratic Republic of the Congo, Gabon, Malawi, Rwanda, Tanzania, and Zambia.

References

Sarothrura
Birds of Central Africa
Birds described in 1884
Taxonomy articles created by Polbot